Virgil Chapman (1895–1951) was a U.S. Senator from Kentucky from 1949 to 1951. Senator Chapman may also refer to:

Charles R. Chapman (1827–1897), Connecticut State Senate
Henry Chapman (American politician) (1804–1891), Pennsylvania State Senate
Hiram Chapman (died 1864), Maine State Senate
Jake Chapman (politician) (born 1985), Iowa State Senate
Jeff Chapman (politician) (fl. 1970s–2010s), Georgia State Senate
John Grant Chapman (1798–1856), Maryland State Senate
Orlow W. Chapman (1831–1890), New York State Senate
Pleasant T. Chapman (1854–1931), Illinois State Senate
Theodore S. Chapman (1849–1914), Illinois State Senate